Babulal Patodi (1920-2012) was an Indian social worker and freedom activist. He was a senior member of the Indian National Congress and the president of the Indore Congress Committee from 1949–50 and 1953-54. He also served as M.L.A. The Government of India awarded him the fourth highest civilian award of the Padma Shri, in 1991. He died on 25 January 2012, aged 92, succumbing to old age illnesses and survived by his one son Narendra Patodi. A statue has been installed at top Gomatgiri hills in his honour.

See also

 Indian freedom struggle

References

External links

Recipients of the Padma Shri in public affairs
2012 deaths
People from Indore district
Social workers
Indian civil rights activists
Indian National Congress politicians from Madhya Pradesh
Social workers from Madhya Pradesh
1920 births